Events from the year 1452 in France.

Incumbents
 Monarch – Charles VII

Events

 Ongoing since 1449 – Revolt of Ghent

Arts

The Melun Diptych, a two-panel oil painting by the French court painter Jean Fouquet, was created around 1452.

Deaths

13 June – Jean d'Harcourt, Roman Catholic priest and bishop.
18 December – John VII, Count of Harcourt, nobleman (b. 1369)
Unknown – Guillaume de Littera, Roman Catholic canon and provost (b. 1371).

References

1450s in France